Avery Secondary School is a 1A high school located in Avery, Texas (USA). It is part of the Avery Independent School District located in east central Red River County. In 2022, the school received an "A" rating from the Texas Education Agency

Athletics
The Avery Bulldogs compete in the following sports:

Cross country, volleyball, and basketball

References

External links
Avery ISD

Public high schools in Texas
Schools in Red River County, Texas